City walls of Gdańsk are mostly demolished defensive fortifications in Gdańsk, Poland.

Building of city walls in Danzig began in 1343. The main wall, moat and outer wall were completed in 1380. The medieval wall became obsolete during the 16th century due to the development of artillery. The city began to build a modern fortification in late 16th century and it took decades to finish. Danzig was surrounded by a bastion fort and a stone lock was built in Motława, which could be used to flood the surroundings of the city. Most of the fortifications were demolished during the 1920s.

References

City walls in Poland
Buildings and structures in Gdańsk